Launch Complex 34 (LC-34) is a deactivated launch site on Cape Canaveral Space Force Station, Florida. LC-34 and its companion LC-37 to the north were used by NASA from 1961 through 1968 to launch Saturn I and IB rockets as part of the Apollo program.  It was the site of the Apollo 1 fire, which claimed the lives of astronauts Gus Grissom, Ed White, and Roger Chaffee on January 27, 1967. The first crewed Apollo launch — Apollo 7 on October 11, 1968 — was the last time LC-34 was used.

History

Construction
Work began on LC-34 in 1960, and it was formally dedicated on June 5, 1961. The complex consisted of a launch platform, umbilical tower, mobile service tower, fueling facilities, and a blockhouse. Two steel flame deflectors were mounted on rails to allow placement beneath the launch platform. The service tower was likewise mounted on rails, and it was moved to a position 185 meters west of the pad before launch. At 95 meters high, it was the tallest structure at LC-34.

The blockhouse, located 320 meters from the pad, was modeled after the domed reinforced concrete structure at LC-20. During a launch, it could accommodate 130 people as well as test and instrumentation equipment. Periscopes afforded views outside the windowless facility.

Saturn I series
LC-34 saw its first launch on October 27, 1961. The first Saturn I, Block I, mission SA-1, lofted a dummy upper stage on a suborbital trajectory into the Atlantic. The subsequent three Saturn I launches took place at LC-34, ending with SA-4 on March 28, 1963. The six ensuing Saturn I, Block II launches were conducted at LC-37.

On November 29, 1963, following the death of President John F. Kennedy, his successor Lyndon B. Johnson issued Executive Order 11129 renaming both NASA's Merrit Island Launch Operations Center and "the facilities of Station No. 1 of the Atlantic Missile Range" (a reference to Canaveral AFB) the "John F. Kennedy Space Center". He had also convinced Gov. C. Farris Bryant (D-Fla.) to change the name of Cape Canaveral to Cape Kennedy.  This resulted in some confusion in public perception, which conflated the two. NASA Administrator James E. Webb clarified this by issuing a directive stating the Kennedy Space Center name applied only to Merritt Island, while the Air Force issued a general order renaming the Air Force Station launch site Cape Kennedy Air Force Station.

Saturn IB series
LC-34 was extensively modified to support Saturn IB launches, which began in February 1966. New anchor points were built to fasten the service structure in place during high winds. Access arms on the umbilical tower were rebuilt to match the larger rocket. At the 67-meter level, the swing arm was outfitted with a white room to permit access to the command module at the top of a rocket.

Two Saturn IBs (AS-201 and AS-202) were successfully launched from LC-34 before the Apollo 1 fire brought Apollo activities at the spaceport to an abrupt halt. After the fire, extinguishing equipment was installed at the top of the umbilical tower, and a slide wire was set up to provide astronauts a quick escape in the event of an emergency.

The first crewed Apollo launch—Apollo 7 on October 11, 1968—was the last time LC-34 was used. NASA considered reactivating both LC-34 and LC-37 for the Apollo Applications Program, but instead LC-39B was modified to launch Saturn IBs.

The geographical name change from Cape Canaveral to Cape Kennedy proved to be unpopular, owing to the historical longevity of Cape Canaveral. In 1973, both the Air Force Base and the geographical Cape names were reverted to Canaveral.

Launch Complex 34 today

After the decommissioning of LC-34, the umbilical tower and service structure were razed, leaving only the launch platform standing at the center of the pad. It serves as a memorial to the crew of Apollo 1. A dedicatory plaque affixed to the structure bears the inscription:
LAUNCH COMPLEX 34
Friday, 27 January 1967
1831 Hours

Dedicated to the living memory of the crew of the Apollo 1

U.S.A.F. Lt. Colonel Virgil I. Grissom
U.S.A.F. Lt. Colonel Edward H. White, II
U.S.N. Lt. Commander Roger B. Chaffee

They gave their lives in service to their country in the ongoing exploration of humankind's final frontier. Remember them not for how they died but for those ideals for which they lived.

Another plaque (which was shown in the film Armageddon) reads:
IN MEMORY
OF
THOSE WHO MADE THE ULTIMATE SACRIFICE
SO OTHERS COULD REACH THE STARS

AD ASTRA PER ASPERA
(A ROUGH ROAD LEADS TO THE STARS)

GOD SPEED TO THE CREW
OF
APOLLO 1

Also surviving at the LC-34 site are the two flame deflectors and the blockhouse.
The original spherical Liquid Oxygen (LOX) tank at LC-34 was purchased by SpaceX in 2008, moved to LC-40, refurbished (cleaned, pressure tested, painted white), and now used for Falcon 9 flights.

Gallery

Launch history
This is a complete list of all launches made from LC-34.

See also
List of spaceflights by year
List of Cape Canaveral and Merritt Island launch sites
Project Apollo
Saturn I
Saturn IB
Cape Canaveral Air Force Station Space Launch Complex 37

References
Moonport: A History of Apollo Launch Facilities and Operations

External links

Cape Canaveral Space Force Station
Apollo program
Apollo 1
Apollo 7
Launch complexes of the United States Space Force
1961 establishments in Florida